The Golden Tap Awards (GTAs) is an annual beer awards event held in Toronto, Ontario, Canada. The awards are sponsored and presented by The Bar Towel, a website and forum dedicated to the discussion and promotion of Toronto's craft and microbrew beer scene.

The GTAs were launched in 2003 as a way to recognise the achievements of craft brewers and bar owners in the Greater Toronto Area, hence the "GTA" acronym. In 2006, the scope of the awards was expanded to include brewers and bars throughout the province of Ontario. Winners of the awards are selected via online voting.  In 2003 and 2004, the event took place at The Academy of Spherical Arts. In 2005, the event was moved to beerbistro where each event has featured an all-Ontario craft beer festival to coincide with the awards.

In 2009 the Golden Tap Awards consolidated all awards to recognize winners from across the province, instead of segmenting as GTA and outside of the GTA.  The Golden Tap Awards will also recognize brewers who produce cask-conditioned beers for the first time.

The 2010 Golden Tap Awards were announced on August 21, 2010 at beerbistro, with a special Ontario Craft Brewers dinner taking place on Friday, August 20 as a part of the celebrations.

The last time the awards were held was in 2018. In 2022 the awards may return as their twitter account indicated.

Past winners

2009

 Best micro or craft brewery in Ontario: Beau's All Natural Brewing Company, Vankleek Hill
 Best brewery for cask-conditioned ale in Ontario: Granite Brewery
 Best bar for draught beer selection in Ontario: C'est What
 Best bar for bottled beer selection in Ontario: Bar Volo
 Best bar for cask-conditioned ale in Ontario: Bar Volo
 Best brewpub or tied house in Ontario: Mill Street Brewpub
 Best regularly produced craft beer in Ontario: Beau's All Natural Brewing Company Lug-Tread Lagered Ale
 Best seasonal or specialty craft beer in Ontario: Black Oak Summer Saison
 Best cask-conditioned ale in Ontario: County Durham Hop Head
 Best of the festival: Beau's All Natural Brewing Company Lug-Tread Lagered Ale, Vankleek Hill
 Editor's Circle: Cask Ale Crawl
 Editor's Circle: Rob Creighton & Grand River Brewing
 Editor's Circle: Derek Hyde & Amsterdam Brewing
 Editor's Circle: Jim Brickman

2008

 Best Microbrewery in the GTA: Mill Street Brewery
 Best Microbrewery in Ontario (non-GTA): Beau's All Natural Brewing Company, Vankleek Hill
 Best Beer Brewed in the GTA: Steam Whistle
 Best Beer Brewed in Ontario (non-GTA): Beau's All Natural Brewing Company Lug-Tread Lagered Ale, Vankleek Hill
 Best GTA Beer Bar (Draught Selection): C'est What
 Best GTA Beer Bar (Bottled Selection): beerbistro
 Best Ontario (non-GTA) Beer Bar: The Manx, Ottawa
 Best Ontario (including GTA) Brewpub or Tied House: Mill Street Brewpub, Toronto
 Best Beer of the Fest: Grand River Bumbleberry Wheat, Cambridge

Plus four Editor's Choice Awards, as determined by a panel of Bar Towel members and associates:
 St Veronus, Belgian bistro in Peterborough
 Cameron's Cask Nights, a cask tasting event series
 Dogfish Head Beer Dinner hosted by beerbistro
 Steve Peters, speaker of the Legislative Assembly of Ontario

2007

 Best Microbrewery in the GTA: Mill Street Brewery
 Best Microbrewery in Ontario (non-GTA): Church-Key Brewing Company, Campbellford
 Best Beer Brewed in the GTA: Mill Street Tankhouse Ale
 Best Beer Brewed in Ontario (non-GTA): Beau's All Natural Brewing Company Lug-Tread Lagered Ale, Vankleek Hill
 Best GTA Beer Bar (Draught Selection): C'est What
 Best GTA Beer Bar (Bottled Selection): beerbistro
 Best Ontario (non-GTA) Beer Bar: Augusta's Winking Judge, Hamilton
 Best Ontario (including GTA) Brewpub or Tied House: Mill Street Brewpub, Toronto
 Best Beer of the Fest: Black Oak Transvestite's Tipple, Oakville

Plus four Editor's Choice Awards, as determined by a panel of Bar Towel members and associates:
 Great Lakes Brewery, brewers of Devil's Pale Ale, Orange Peel Ale and others
 Michael Hancock, brewer of Denison's Weissbier and Dunkel
 Roland + Russel, beer importers
 Volo Cask Days, an event organized by Bar Volo in Toronto

2006

 Best Ontario (non-GTA) Beer Bar: Augusta's Winking Judge, Hamilton
 Best GTA Beer Bar (Bottled Selection): Volo
 Best GTA Beer Bar (Draught Selection): C'est What
 Best Ontario (including GTA) Brewpub or Tied House: Granite Brewery, Toronto
 Best Ontario (non-GTA) Microbrewery: Wellington Brewery, Guelph
 Best GTA Microbrewery: Mill Street Brewery
 Best Ontario (non-GTA) Beer: Scotch-Irish Sgt. Major's IPA, Ottawa
 Best GTA Beer: Mill Street Tankhouse Ale
 Best Beer of the Fest: Beau's All Natural Brewing Company Lug Tread Lagered Ale "Kolsch-Bock"

2005

 Best Beer Bar (Bottled Selection): Smokeless Joe
 Best Beer Bar (Draught Selection): C'est What
 Best New Beer Bar: beerbistro
 Best Microbrewery: Mill Street Brewery
 Best Beer: Mill Street Tankhouse Pale Ale
 Best New Beer: Cameron's Dark 266
 Best Beer of the Fest: Black Oak Hop Bomb

2004

 Best Beer Bar (Bottled Selection): Smokeless Joe
 Best Beer Bar (Draught Selection): C'est What
 Best Microbrewery: Mill Street Brewery
 Best Beer: (tie) Mill Street Tankhouse Pale Ale and Steam Whistle Pilsner

2003

 Best Beer Bar (Bottled Selection): Smokeless Joe
 Best Beer Bar (Draught Selection): C'est What
 Best Microbrewery: Black Oak Brewing
 Best Brewpub: Granite Brewery
 Best Beer: Granite Best Bitter Special

See also
Beer in Canada

References

External links
 Golden Tap Awards official website
 The Bar Towel

Festivals in Toronto
Beer festivals in Canada
Beer awards
Annual events in Canada